John Shea (8 May 1913 – 7 February 1986) was an Australian cricketer. He played five first-class matches for Western Australia between 1936/37 and 1945/46.

See also
 List of Western Australia first-class cricketers

References

External links
 

1913 births
1986 deaths
Australian cricketers
Western Australia cricketers
Cricketers from Western Australia
People from Boulder, Western Australia